The 2022 Elmbridge Borough Council election was held on 5 May 2022 to elect members of Elmbridge Borough Council in England.

Results summary

Results by Ward

Claygate

Cobham & Downside

Esher

Hersham Village

Hinchley Wood & Weston Green

Long Ditton

Molesey East

Molesey West

Oatlands & Burwood Park

Oxshott & Stoke D'Abernon

Thames Ditton

Walton Central

Walton North

Walton South

Weybridge Riverside

Weybridge St. George's Hill

References

Elmbridge
2022
2020s in Surrey
May 2022 events in the United Kingdom